Rekha (born 1954) is an Indian actress.

Rekha may also refer to:
 Rekha (South Indian actress) (born 1970), Tamil and Malayalam actress
 Rekha (film), a 1943 film
 Rekha (given name)